Sawantwadi Road railway station is a train station on the Konkan Railway. It is at a distance of  down from origin. The preceding station on the line is Zarap railway station and the next station is Madure railway station.

References

External links 

Railway stations along Konkan Railway line
Railway stations in Sindhudurg district
Railway stations opened in 1996
Ratnagiri railway division
Transport in Sawantwadi
Sawantwadi